Grotesk Burlesk was the ninth tour Marilyn Manson embarked on, under management of major record label Interscope Records. It was the band's fifth tour to span over multiple legs. The band was on tour from April 11, 2003, until January 3, 2004.

Many of the costumes and attire used for the tour were tailored by French fashion designer and grand couturier Jean-Paul Gaultier.

Performance and show themes
The stage was designed to resemble that of the classic vaudeville and burlesque stage shows of the 1930s, a prevalent motif found in the album itself. Encompassing this theme most notably were two live dancers dressed in vintage burlesque costume who would be present on stage for most of the show, they danced for "mOBSCENE" and "Sweet Dreams (Are Made of This)", and performed piano for "The Golden Age of Grotesque" and floor toms for "Doll-Dagga Buzz-Buzz Ziggety-Zag". They also appeared during performances of "Para-noir". Dressed as if they were conjoined, they accompanied Manson as he was elevated some 12 metre (39 ft) above the stage, much like during performances of "Cruci-Fiction in Space" on the Guns, God and Government tour. The stage also utilized a series of platforms. Manson would sing at a podium for performances of "The Fight Song", donning blackface while wearing an Allgemeine SS-style peaked police cap or, alternatively, Mickey Mouse ears. During performances of "The Dope Show", Manson would wear elongated arms designed by Rudy Coby, which he would swing in a marching manner as he walked along the stage. At the end of each performance of "The Golden Age of Grotesque", Manson played saxophone—a rare instance of the vocalist playing a live instrument in concert.

Lineup
Vocals: Marilyn Manson
Guitar: John 5
Bass: Tim Sköld
Keyboards: Madonna Wayne Gacy
Drums: Ginger Fish

Supporting acts
 Queen Adreena 
 Apocalyptica
 Mudvayne 
 Peaches

Track listing

 "Repent"
 "Thaeter"
 "This Is the New Shit"
 "Disposable Teens"
 "Irresponsible Hate Anthem"
 "Astonishing Panorama of the Endtimes"
 "Use Your Fist and Not Your Mouth"
 "Great Big White World"
 "Lunchbox" (Spoken)
 "1996" (Spoken)
 "Rock Is Dead"
 "Mobscene"
 "Tainted Love"
 "Para-Noir"
 "Tourniquet"
 "Baboon Rape Party"
 "The Dope Show"
 "Saint"
 "The Golden Age of Grotesque"
 "Doll-Dagga Buzz-Buzz Ziggety-Zag"
 "Sweet Dreams (Are Made of This)" (With "The Reflecting God" outro)
 "Rock 'n' Roll Nigger" 
 "Obsequey (The Death of Art)"
 "It's a Small World"
 "The Fight Song"
 "The Beautiful People"
 "Better of Two Evils"

Opening songs 
 "Disposable Teens" (2003/05/29 Lisbon, Portugal, 2003/05/31 Derby, England and few others)
 "This Is the New Shit"

Grotesk Burlesk spring european tour

Tour dates

  Non-Ozzfest shows.
  Show cancelled early. See cancelled or rescheduled shows for more info.

Cancelled or rescheduled shows

References

2003 concert tours
Marilyn Manson (band) concert tours